Devendrasingh Bundela (born 22 February 1977) is a former Indian cricketer. He is a right-handed batsman for Madhya Pradesh and made his first-class debut in 1995/96. He was a highly successful professional for Whitehaven Cricket Club 2001–03. He became captain of Madhya Pradesh in 2010 Ranji Trophy and was promoted to Ranji Trophy Super League next season. In November 2016, he made the record of highest Ranji Trophy appearances. He announced his retirement on 31 March 2018.

References

External links
 

1977 births
Living people
Indian cricketers
Madhya Pradesh cricketers
Central Zone cricketers
People from Ujjain